Cebo Tshiki (born 21 March 1990) is a South African first-class cricketer. He was included in the Boland cricket team for the 2015 Africa T20 Cup. In September 2018, he was named in Boland's squad for the 2018 Africa T20 Cup. In September 2019, he was named in Boland's squad for the 2019–20 CSA Provincial T20 Cup.

References

External links
 

1990 births
Living people
South African cricketers
Boland cricketers
People from Raymond Mhlaba Local Municipality